Gaddopur is an industrial area in Faizabad, Uttar Pradesh, India.

Demographics
Gaddopur is a typical Uttar Pradesh village with a population of about 8,000. The people are a mix of Thakur, Brahmins, Yadavs, Bania, Kumhar and Dalits. The village is dominated by Thakur, Brahmins and Yadav. The majority of the population depend upon agriculture. However, a few of people of Brahmins and Thakurs are in Central/State Government job.

Transport

By road
Gaddopur is situated on the East West National Corridor (NH 27) way to Lucknow and Gorakhpur road and is also well connected to other cities, towns and markets viz.

By train
Faizabad Railway Station is the nearest railway station which is 2 km away. Name of Faizabad Jn. railway station has now been changed to Ayodhya Cantt. to make it more align with the district name i.e., Ayodhya.

Localities 
Gaddopur has a village attached to it known as Gaddopur (Bada and Chhota) other villages namely Paliya shahbadi and Banbeerpur is also attached to it though not included in Gaddopur gram sabha.

Neighboring villages of Gaddopur
Several villages are situated at the outskirt of Gaddopur village some of them are of Gaddopur gram sabha and a few are not.

]

References

Industrial Area in Faizabad
Cities and towns in Faizabad district